Cutting Ties may refer to:

 Cutting Ties (story), from the anthology Star Trek Mirror Universe: Obsidian Alliances
 "Cutting Ties" (6lack song), a 2017 song by 6lack
 "Cutting Ties", a song on the 2014 soundtrack album  Days of Future Past
 "Cutting Ties", a 2022 TV episode of Zatima

See also
 "Cut Ties", episode from the American television series Justified